Cutting is a surname. Notable people with the surname include:

 Alastair Cutting (born 1960), Church of England Archdeacon
 Andy Cutting (born 1969), English folk musician and composer
 Austin Cutting (born 1996), American football player
 Ben Cutting (born 1987), Australian cricketer
 Bronson M. Cutting (1888–1935), U.S. Senator from New Mexico, publisher and military attaché
 Charles Suydam Cutting (1889–1972), American explorer, naturalist, society figure, philanthropist, and author
 Doug Cutting, open-source search advocate
 Elise Justine Bayard Cutting (1823–1853), American poet
 Francis B. Cutting (1804–1870), U.S. Representative from New York
 Francis Cutting (c. 1550–1595/6), English lutenist and composer
 Fred Cutting (1921–1997), English footballer
 Harmon S. Cutting (1830–1884), American mayor of Buffalo, New York
 Henry C. Cutting (1870–?), California entrepreneur
 Iris Margaret Cutting (1902–1988), English born biographer and writer
 Jack Cutting (disambiguation)
 James Cutting (disambiguation)
 Joe Cutting (1885–?), American college football player and coach
 John Cutting (disambiguation)
 Jonas Cutting (1800–1876), American judge
 Justine Bayard Cutting (1879–1975), American educator
 Laurie Cutting, American psychologist
 Mary Stewart Cutting (1851–1928), American author and suffragist
 Olivia Peyton Murray Cutting (1855–1949), American socialite
 Robert Cutting (disambiguation)
 Skip Cutting (born 1946), American cyclist
 Stan Cutting (1914–2004), English footballer who played for Southampton and Exeter City
 Ted Cutting (1926–2012), British automotive engineer
 William Cutting (1832–1897), American lawyer 
 William Bayard Cutting (1850–1912), American sugar beet refiner and financier
 William Bayard Cutting Jr. (1878–1910), American diplomat
 Windsor C. Cutting (1907–1972), American physician